The 1980 Cork Senior Football Championship was the 92nd staging of the Cork Senior Football Championship since its establishment by the Cork County Board in 1887. The championship began on 5 April 1980 and ended on 14 September 1980.

St. Finbarr's entered the championship as the defending champions.

On 14 September 1980, St. Finbarr's won the championship following a 3-08 to 1-09 defeat of University College Cork in the final. This was their sixth championship title overall and their second title in succession.

Jamesie O'Callaghan of the St. Finbarr's club was the championship's top scorer with 7-28.

Team changes

To Championship

Promoted from the Cork Intermediate Football Championship
 Adrigole

Results

Division 1

Table

{| class="wikitable" style="text-align:center"
!width=20|
!width=150 style="text-align:left;"|Team
!width=20|
!width=20|
!width=20|
!width=20|
!width=40|
!width=40|
!width=20|
!width=20|
|- style="background:#ccffcc"
|1||align=left| Nemo Rangers ||4||4||0||0||8-57||3-29||43||8
|- style="background:#ccffcc"
|2||align=left| St. Finbarr's ||4||3||0||1||9-41||4-36||20||6
|- style="background:#ccffcc"
|3||align=left| St Michael's ||4||2||0||2||4-41||10-40||-17||4
|- 
|4||align=left| St. Nicholas' ||4||1||0||3||9-23||7-43||-14||2
|- 
|5||align=left| Bishopstown ||4||0||0||4||2-26||8-40||-32||0
|-|align=left|
|colspan="10" style="border:0px"| Green background The three top-placed teams qualified for the quarter-final stage of the championship proper.
|}

Group stage results

Division 2

Table

{| class="wikitable" style="text-align:center"
!width=20|
!width=150 style="text-align:left;"|Team
!width=20|
!width=20|
!width=20|
!width=20|
!width=40|
!width=40|
!width=20|
!width=20|
|- style="background:#ccffcc"
|1||align=left| UCC ||4||3||1||0||9-47||5-34||25||7
|- style="background:#ccffcc"
|2||align=left| Castlehaven ||4||3||0||1||5-47||5-36||11||6
|- 
|3||align=left| Millstreet ||4||2||1||1||5-36||6-35||-2||5
|- 
|4||align=left| Glanworth ||4||1||0||3||5-35||5-40||-5||2
|- 
|5||align=left| Clonakilty ||4||0||0||4||5-31||8-51||-29||0
|-|align=left|
|colspan="10" style="border:0px"| Green background The three top-placed teams qualified for the quarter-final stage of the championship proper.
|}

Group stage results

Division 3

Table

{| class="wikitable" style="text-align:center"
!width=20|
!width=150 style="text-align:left;"|Team
!width=20|
!width=20|
!width=20|
!width=20|
!width=40|
!width=40|
!width=20|
!width=20|
|- style="background:#ccffcc"
|1||align=left| Naomh Abán ||4||4||0||0||7-42||5-16||32||8
|- style="background:#ccffcc"
|2||align=left| Bantry Blues ||4||3||0||1||13-21||4-26||22||6
|- 
|3||align=left| Dohenys ||4||2||0||2||5-22|12-25||-24||4
|- 
|4||align=left| Na Piarsaigh ||4||1||0||3||2-22||2-23||-1||2
|- 
|5||align=left| Adrigole ||4||0||0||4||5-13||7-27||-20||0
|-|align=left|
|colspan="10" style="border:0px"| Green background The three top-placed teams qualified for the quarter-final stage of the championship proper.
|}

Group stage results

Division 4

Quarter-finals

Semi-finals

Final

Championship statistics

Top scorers

Overall

Miscellaneous

 Adrigole withdrew midway through the championship after finding it difficult to field a team.
 The attendance at the final of 4,500 was the smallest since 1972.
 St. Finbarr's became the first single entity club to achieve the double.

References

Cork Senior Football Championship
1980 in Gaelic football